Zhang Nan (born 16 January 1987) is a Chinese professional racing cyclist. She rides for China Chongming-Liv-Champion System Pro Cycling. She is from Liaoning. She competed at the 2014 Asian Games.

See also
 List of 2015 UCI Women's Teams and riders

References

External links

1987 births
Living people
Chinese female cyclists
Cyclists from Liaoning
Cyclists at the 2014 Asian Games
Asian Games competitors for China